Nowa Wieś Malborska  is a village in the administrative district of Gmina Malbork, within Malbork County, Pomeranian Voivodeship, in northern Poland. The voivodeship road 515 runs through the village.

The village has a population of 380.

References

Villages in Malbork County